McVerry is a surname. Notable people with the surname include:

Michael McVerry (1949–1973), Provisional IRA member
Peter McVerry (born 1944), Irish Roman Catholic priest and activist
Terrence F. McVerry (born 1943), American federal judge
Tom McVerry (born 1980), Australian rugby union player